This list of fictional primates in literature is a subsidiary to the articles of list of fictional primates and list of fictional animals. The list is restricted to notable non-human primate characters that appear in notable works of literature.

See also
List of fictional primates

References

Literature
Primates